Bigarade sauce is an orange sauce prepared on the French dish duck á l'orange. It is based on the gastrique, a carmelized sugar mixed with white vinegar.

See also
 List of sauces

References

French sauces